Acascosa Lake  is a lake in Conejos County, Colorado, United States.

The name "Acascosa" probably comes from Spanish agua ascosa, meaning "stagnant water".

It is located just under 20 miles from Capulin, Colorado.

References

Lakes of Colorado
Lakes of Conejos County, Colorado